The following is a list of crooners and includes artists who have been described as a crooner at some point in their career. Crooners are singers who sing in a soft, intimate style made possible by the introduction of microphones and amplification.

Golden Age (1920s-1960s) 

Al Bowlly
Al Jolson
Al Martino
Alan Dale
Andy Russell
Andy Williams
Arthur Prysock
Billy Eckstine
Bing Crosby
Bob Crosby
Bobby Darin
Bobby Rydell
Bobby Short
Brook Benton
Buddy Clark
Buddy Greco
Carlos Gardel
Charles Aznavour
Cheo Feliciano
Cliff Richard
Dean Martin
Desi Arnaz
Dick Farney
Dick Haymes
Dick Powell
Dick Todd
Domenico Modugno
Don Cornell
Ed Ames
Eddie Fisher
Eddy Arnold
Elvis Presley
Engelbert Humperdinck
Fabian
Frank Sinatra
Frank Sinatra Jr.
Frankie Laine
Frankie Randall
Gene Austin
Jack Jones
James Darren
Jerry Vale
Jim Morrison
Jimmy Roselli
Johnny Dorelli
Johnny Hartman
Johnny Marvin
Johnny Mathis
Julio Iglesias
Julius La Rosa
Kyu Sakamoto
Lou Rawls
Lucho Gatica
Matt Monro
Mel Tormé
Merv Griffin
Mike Douglas
Nat King Cole
Neil Diamond
Neil Hannon
Nick Lucas
Pat Boone
Paul Anka
Perry Como
Ricky Nelson
Roy Orbison
Rudy Vallée
Russ Columbo
Sam Browne
Sam Cooke
Sammy Davis Jr.
Sandro de América
Sergio Franchi
Silvio Berlusconi
Tom Jones
Tony Bennett
Tony Clifton
Tony Martin
Val Doonican
Val Rosing
Vaughn De Leath
Vaughn Monroe
Vic Damone
Wayne Newton
Whispering Jack Smith

Post-Golden Age (1970s-Present)

Alejandro Fernández
Alex Turner
Amaury Vassili
Anthony Strong
Barry Manilow
Barry White
Bobby Caldwell
Boz Scaggs
Bryan Ferry
Camilo Sesto
Chris Isaak
Gino Vannelli
Harry Connick, Jr
Josh Tillman
Luther Vandross
Michael Bolton
Michael Bublé
Nick Cave
Sam Smith
Seth MacFarlane
Terry Blade

See also
Traditional pop
Easy listening

References

Crooner
Crooners